Mimulus ringens is a species of monkeyflower known by the common names Allegheny monkeyflower and square-stemmed monkeyflower.

It is native to eastern and central North America and has been introduced to the Pacific Northwest. It grows in a wide variety of moist to wet habitat types. Seeds are available from commercial suppliers.

The sessile leaves of M. ringens help to distinguish it from its eastern relative, Mimulus alatus, which bears leaves on petioles and has a winged stem. The herbage is hairless. The flower is lavender, blue, red or pink in color and is divided into an upper lip and a larger, swollen lower lip.

One variety of this plant, var. colophilus, is rare, ecologically restricted, and vulnerable. It is known from Quebec, it has been reported in Vermont, and there are a few occurrences in Maine, where it grows only in freshwater sections of tidal estuaries. This plant variety faces several threats, but its current status is not known due to a lack of data.

References

External links

 
University of California, Berkeley CalPhotos

ringens
Flora of the Northeastern United States
Flora of the United States
Plants described in 1753
Taxa named by Carl Linnaeus
Flora of the Southeastern United States
Flora of the Great Lakes region (North America)
Flora of Canada
Flora without expected TNC conservation status